RDAC may refer to:

 Digital potentiometer, also known as a Resistive Digital-to-Analog Converter
 Radioactinium, abbreviated RdAc, a name given at one time to 227 Th, an isotope of thorium
 Rebel Diaz Arts Collective, a community arts center in New York City
 Redundant Disk Array Controller, a type of computing hardware
 Roller Derby Association of Canada
 Randall Davey House and surrounding Randall Davey Audubon Centre